Kanhaipur is a village in Mirzapur District, Marihan Sub-District, Uttar Pradesh, India.

Total Population in 2008: 2,016. Male Population: 1,058
Female Population: 958

Villages in Mirzapur district